Dilys Laye (born Dilys Lay; 11 March 1934 – 13 February 2009) was an English actress and screenwriter, best known for her comedy roles.

Early life 
Laye was born in Muswell Hill, London, the daughter of Edward Lay and his wife Margaret (née Hewitt). Her father left the family when she was aged eight to work as a musician in South Africa and never came back. During World War II Laye and her brother were evacuated to Devon, where they were unhappy and endured physical abuse. Laye returned home to a new stepfather and a mother who was keen to transfer her thwarted ambitions to her daughter. After education at St Dominic's Sixth Form College, Middlesex and training at the Aida Foster School, Laye made her stage debut aged 14 as a boy in a play called The Burning Bush at the New Lindsey Theatre and her film debut a year later as a younger version of Jean Kent in Trottie True.

Career 

From 1950, Laye appeared in numerous West End revues, including And So to Bed, Intimacy at 8.30, For Amusement Only, and High Spirits. In 1954, she played the first Dulcie in The Boy Friend on Broadway alongside Julie Andrews, with whom she shared a Manhattan flat during the run. At this time she dated a young actor called James Garner. In 1957, she began appearing in films more regularly, including one of the schoolgirls in Blue Murder at St Trinian's and a married vamp trying to seduce Dirk Bogarde in Doctor at Large. She played a girl in the park, in the Norman Wisdom film Follow a Star (1959). She also appeared with Ian Carmichael in the comedy play The Tunnel of Love in the West End and was directed by Joan Littlewood in Make Me An Offer.

In 1962, Laye made her first appearance in the Carry On films, replacing an unwell Joan Sims in Carry On Cruising at four days' notice. She returned in the James Bond parody Carry On Spying (1964), a hospital patient who falls in love with Bernard Bresslaw in Carry On Doctor (1967), and as his permanently car-sick companion, on holiday with Sid James and Sims in Carry On Camping (1969), her fourth and last in the series. Also, in 1962, Laye appeared in the British sitcom The Rag Trade. In 1965, she starred with her good friend Sheila Hancock in the sitcom The Bed-Sit Girl and appeared in the West End comedy Say Who You Are.

In 1975, she co-starred with Reg Varney in a failed sitcom called Down the 'Gate and, in 1981, appeared in and co-wrote, the ITV comedy series Chintz. In 1986, she played the Nurse in Romeo and Juliet with the Royal Shakespeare Company and her other credits with the RSC in the mid to late-1980s included Maria in Twelfth Night, First Witch in Macbeth, Glinda/Aunt Em in The Wizard of Oz and Parthy Ann in an Opera North version of Show Boat. In 2000 she returned to the RSC to play Mrs Medlock in its musical of The Secret Garden, directed by Adrian Noble.

In the early 1990s, she toured the country in The Phantom of the Opera and 42nd Street, among others. Her later West End credits included the musicals Nine in 1997 and Into the Woods in 1998 at the Donmar Warehouse and Mrs Pearce in Trevor Nunn's revival of My Fair Lady at the Theatre Royal, Drury Lane in 2002. She also starred in a revival of Christopher Hampton's Les Liaisons Dangereuses at the Playhouse Theatre in 2003. The production was not admired but Laye's performance (as Madame de Rosemond) was and she received the Clarence Derwent Award for Best Female in a Supporting Role. In 2005, she toured Britain as the Grandmother in Roald Dahl's The Witches.

Later years 
Her final stage work came in 2006 in the three roles of Miss La Creevy, Mrs Gudden, and Peg Sliderskew in the Chichester Festival Theatre's revival of the RSC's epic Nicholas Nickleby. During rehearsals, she was diagnosed with cancer and kept her illness secret from the rest of the cast, but was too ill to transfer with the production to London.

Her later television work included character roles in EastEnders, Coronation Street, Holby City, Midsomer Murders, Doctors, The Amazing Mrs Pritchard, and The Commander.

Personal life and death
She was married first, briefly, to stuntman Frank Maher and secondly in 1963, to actor Garfield Morgan; they were subsequently divorced. In 1972, she married her third husband, Alan Downer, who wrote scripts for Coronation Street and Emmerdale Farm on television and Waggoners' Walk on radio. He died in 1995 after years of ill health following a stroke. They had a son, Andrew, who was an agent for film crews.

Laye died of lung cancer aged 74. She outlived her doctors' predictions by six months, and was able to see her son get married.

Filmography

Trottie True (1949) - Trottie as a young girl
Torment (1950) - Violet Crier
The Belles of St. Trinian's (1954) - Sixth Former
Doctor at Large (1957) - Mrs Jasmine Hatchet
Blue Murder at St Trinian's (1957) - Bridget Strong
Idol on Parade (1959) - Renee
The Bridal Path (1959) - Isobel
Upstairs and Downstairs (1959) - Agency girl
Follow a Star (1959) - Lady with dog called Poochie-Pie
Please Turn Over (1959) - Millicent Jones
Petticoat Pirates (1961) - Sue
Carry On Cruising (1962) - Flo Castle
On the Beat (1962) - American girl
Carry On Spying (1964) - Lila 
A Countess from Hong Kong (1967) - Saleswoman
Carry On Doctor (1967) - Mavis Winkle
Carry On Camping (1969) - Anthea Meeks
EastEnders (Television) Recurring role 1994–95, Maxine Palmer
Alice in Wonderland (1999) - The Governess
Coronation Street (2000–2001) - Isabel Stephens
Dog Eat Dog (2001) - Edith Scarman
 Frankie Howerd: Rather You Than Me (2008) - Edith Howerd

In the 1980s she appeared in, and co-wrote, the ITV comedy series Chintz.

References

External links

Article about Dilys in The Stage
Obituary in The Guardian

1934 births
2009 deaths
Deaths from cancer in England
English film actresses
English soap opera actresses
English stage actresses
English television actresses
People from Muswell Hill
Alumni of the Aida Foster Theatre School
20th-century British businesspeople